General elections were held in Saint Kitts and Nevis on 24 October 2004. The result was a victory for the Saint Kitts and Nevis Labour Party, which received over 50% of the vote and won seven of the eleven directly-elected seats in the National Assembly.

Results

Elections in Saint Kitts and Nevis
Saint Kitts
2004 in Saint Kitts and Nevis